This list is of the Cultural Properties of Japan designated in the category of  for the Urban Prefecture of Kyoto.

National Cultural Properties
As of 1 December 2014, twenty Important Cultural Properties have been designated, being of national significance.

Prefectural Cultural Properties
As of 1 December 2014, thirteen properties have been designated at a prefectural level.

Registered Cultural Properties
In addition, as of 1 December 2014 one property has been registered (as opposed to designated) nationally and another at the prefectural level:

See also
 Cultural Properties of Japan
 List of National Treasures of Japan (historical materials)
 Kyoto National Museum

References

External links
  Cultural Properties in Kyoto Prefecture
  Cultural Properties in Kyoto City

Cultural Properties of Japan - historical materials
Historical materials,Kyoto